Mustaqim Manzur (born 28 January 1982) is a professional soccer player who plays for the Home United in the S.League and the Singapore national football team.

He is a natural left winger, though he can also play as a right winger.

Club career
Mustaqim has previously played for S.League clubs Gombak United, Singapore Armed Forces FC, Home United and Young Lions.

International career
He made his debut for the Singapore against Qatar on 19 November 2003.

Honours

Club
Singapore Armed Forces
S.League: 2006, 2007, 2008, 2009
Singapore Cup: 2007, 2008

External links

data2.7m.cn

youtube.com
safwarriors.com.sg
gifc.org.sg

Living people
Singaporean footballers
Singapore international footballers
Warriors FC players
1982 births
Gombak United FC players
Association football midfielders
Home United FC players
Singapore Premier League players
Young Lions FC players